Xiaoming Wang-Dréchou (born 14 June 1963) is a Chinese-born female former international table tennis player.

Table Tennis career
She won a bronze medal for France at the 1991 World Table Tennis Championships in the Corbillon Cup (women's team event) with Emmanuelle Coubat, Sandrine Derrien, and Agnès Le Lannic.

She represented France at the 1992 and 1996 Summer Olympics.

See also
 List of World Table Tennis Championships medalists

References

Chinese emigrants to France
Naturalized citizens of France
People who lost Chinese citizenship
Table tennis players at the 1992 Summer Olympics
Table tennis players at the 1996 Summer Olympics
Naturalised table tennis players
People from Yibin
Table tennis players from Sichuan
1963 births
Living people
French female table tennis players
Chinese female table tennis players
Olympic table tennis players of France
World Table Tennis Championships medalists